Ancistrolepis is a genus of sea snails, marine gastropod molluscs in the family Buccinidae, the true whelks.

Species
Species within the genus Ancistrolepis include:
 Ancistrolepis californicus 
 Ancistrolepis eucosmius 
 Ancistrolepis grammatus 
 Ancistrolepis hikidai 
 Ancistrolepis kawamurai 
 Ancistrolepis okhotensis 
 Ancistrolepis vietnamensis 

Subgenera formerly placed in Ancistrolepis:
 Ancistrolepis (Clinopegma) elevated to Clinopegma 
 Ancistrolepis (Japelion) elevated to Japelion 

Species formerly placed in Ancistrolepis:
 Ancistrolepis beringianus is a synonym of Neancistrolepis beringianus 
 Ancistrolepis damon is a synonym of Clinopegma magnum damon 
 Ancistrolepis decora is a synonym of Clinopegma decora 
 Ancistrolepis (Clinopegma) decora is a synonym of Clinopegma decora 
 Ancistrolepis fujitai is a synonym of Parancistrolepis fujitai 
 Ancistrolepis hiranoi is a synonym of Parancistrolepis fujitai 
 Ancistrolepis latus is a synonym of Japelion latus 
 Ancistrolepis magna is a synonym of Clinopegma magnum 
 Ancistrolepis sasakii is a synonym of Clinopegma sasakii 
 Ancistrolepis trochoideus is a synonym of Bathyancistrolepis trochoideus

References

External links

Buccinidae
Gastropod genera